Quautico Moreno "Tico" Brown (born July 17, 1957) is an American former professional basketball player. He was born in Kokomo, Indiana. At 6'5" tall, and 180-pounds, he played at the shooting guard position.

College career
Brown began his college basketball career in 1975, at Emmanuel College in Franklin Springs, Georgia, before starring at the Georgia Institute of Technology, from 1976–79, averaging 16 points per game over three seasons.

Professional career
Brown was selected by the Utah Jazz, in the second round (23rd pick overall) of the 1979 NBA draft, and spent eight seasons in the Continental Basketball Association (CBA), where he was a member of two championship teams.  He retired in 1988, as the league's all-time leading scorer (with 8,538 points), and was voted to the All-Time CBA Team.  He also played overseas in Switzerland, Venezuela, and Belgium.

A prolific scorer, Brown scored 53 points in a February 1987 game, while playing for the CBA's Savannah (Ga.) Spirits.  He also logged a 52-point game 11 days earlier, and had a 51-point game in December 1986.  In a double-overtime game on March 30, 1983, during the CBA Championship Series, Brown scored 60 points, to help the Detroit Spirits down the Montana Golden Nuggets, 136–128.  His team went on to win the best-of-seven championship, 4 games to 3.

Post-playing career
In October 2007, Brown was inducted into the Howard (Indiana) County Sports Hall of Fame.

Personal
One of Tico's sons, Rion, played for the University of Miami men's basketball team, from 2010 to 2014.

References

1957 births
Living people
American expatriate basketball people in Belgium
American expatriate basketball people in Switzerland
American expatriate basketball people in Venezuela
American men's basketball players
Anchorage Northern Knights players
Basketball players from Indiana
Georgia Tech Yellow Jackets men's basketball players
Savannah Spirits players
Shooting guards
Sportspeople from Kokomo, Indiana
Utah Jazz draft picks